Holla was a parish, district and former municipality now located in the municipality of Nome in Telemark, Norway.

History
Holla is situated in the traditional region of Midt-Telemark. Holla parish included the churches at Holla and Helgen both in Telemark county.  The parish of Holden (Holla) was established as a municipality January 1, 1838 (see formannskapsdistrikt). The municipality centre was Ulefoss. On 1 January 1964 the district of Valebø with 259 inhabitants was moved to Skien. The rest of Holla, then with 4,093 inhabitants, was merged with Lunde to form the new municipality of Nome.

The name
The municipality (originally the parish) is named after the Holla farm (Holla gård) – the biggest farm in Telemark. (Old Norse Höllin, from *Hallvin), since the first church was built there. The first element is hallr 'sloping', the last element is vin f 'meadow'.
Until 1889 the name was written Holden. During the period 1889–1917, the name was written as Hollen. Dating from 1918, the spelling of the name has been Holla.

Holla Church ruins 

Old Holla or Holden Church was  a medieval stone church, situated near the Holla gård. The church had a view over lake Norsjø. Today only the ruins (Holla kyrkjeruin)  are left.

Holla Church 
Holla Church (Holla Kirke) is a Gothic Revival-style church which dates from 1867.  The church was donated to the community by Severin Diderik Cappelen (1820-1881) who was the owner of Ulefos Jernværk and served as mayor in Holla. The structure is of brick and has 600 seats. The architect was Peter Høier Holtermann (1820-1865). The church was restored during 1916.

References

Other sources
Halvorsen,  Tormod  (1986)  Tidsskrift for Holla historielag   (Holla historielag) 
Hauge, Yngvar (1957)  Ulefos jernværk 1657-1957 (Oslo: Aschehoug)

External links
Map of Holla

Former municipalities of Norway
Nome, Norway